Italy competed at the 1994 Winter Olympics in Lillehammer, Norway.

Medalists

Competitors
The following is the list of number of competitors in the Games.

Alpine skiing

Men

Men's combined

Women

Women's combined

Biathlon

Men

Men's 4 × 7.5 km relay

Women

 1 A penalty loop of 150 metres had to be skied per missed target.
 2 One minute added per missed target.

Bobsleigh

Cross-country skiing

Men

 1 Starting delay based on 10 km results. 
 C = Classical style, F = Freestyle

Men's 4 × 10 km relay

Women

 2 Starting delay based on 5 km results. 
 C = Classical style, F = Freestyle

Women's 4 × 5 km relay

Freestyle skiing

Men

Women

Ice hockey

Group B
Twelve participating teams were placed in the two groups. After playing a round-robin, the top four teams in each group advanced to the Medal Round while the last two teams competed in the consolation round for the 9th to 12th places.

Consolation round

|}

9th place match

|}

Leading scorer

Team roster
Bruno Campese
David Delfino
Mike Rosati
Phil Di Gaetano
Robert Oberrauch
Leo Insam
Jim Camazzola
Bill Stewart
Anthony Circelli
Michael De Angelis
Luigi Da Corte
Emilio Iovio
Lino De Toni
Roland Ramoser
Maurizio Mansi
Bruno Zarrillo
Gaetano Orlando
Alexander Gschliesser
Patrick Brugnoli
Lucio Topatigh
Martin Pavlu
Vezio Sacratini
Stephan Figliuzzi
Head coach: Bryan Lefley

Luge

Men

(Men's) Doubles

Women

Nordic combined 

Men's individual

Events:
 normal hill ski jumping
 15 km cross-country skiing 

Men's Team

Three participants per team.

Events:
 normal hill ski jumping
 10 km cross-country skiing

Short track speed skating

Men

Women

Ski jumping 

Men's team large hill

 1 Four teams members performed two jumps each.

Speed skating

Men

Women

References

Sources
Official Olympic Reports
International Olympic Committee results database
 Olympic Winter Games 1994, full results by sports-reference.com

Nations at the 1994 Winter Olympics
Winter
1994